The speed limit for cars in Ukraine are as follows:

 in populated areas (designated by white road signs with town/city name). Blue road signs with village/town names on it do not override road's speed limit.
 within residential areas
 outside populated areas
 on dual carriageways
 on motorways.

New drivers

Motorcycles and automobiles with trailers
 in populated areas
 otherwise
 for car towing

References

Ukraine
Transport in Ukraine